Conde de Venadito was a  unprotected cruiser of the Spanish Navy. It was built at the naval shipyard at Cartagena, Spain in 1883, and was completed and launched five years later. In 1895, she unsuccessfully attempted to sink the American merchant ship Allianca off Cape Maisi, Cuba under the suspicion that she was smuggling arms to the Cuban insurgents. She was stricken from the register in 1907 and was finally sunk in 1936 as a target ship.

Construction and design
Conde de Venadito was built at the naval shipyard at Cartagena, Spain. Her keel was laid in 1883, she was launched on 15 August 1888, and she was completed in 1888 or 1889. Her armament consisted of four  guns, four 6-pounder (57 mm) guns, one machine gun and two  torpedo tubes operated by a crew of 173 officers and enlisted men. She had one rather tall funnel, an iron hull and was rigged as a barque.

Service history 
She participated in the quadcentennial of Christopher Columbus's discovery of the "New World". The Royal family of the United Kingdom used the ship for the large reception. The Monday after the celebration (at 8 AM), when the ships of other nations were leaving, the ship with the Royal family passed the line of ships as they waved goodbye. During 1894, she was part of the "training and evolutionary" squadron of the Spanish navy, which was located off the cost of Cuba, which was announced by the Spanish Minister of Marine earlier that year.

Allianca incident 
In March 1895, Conde de Venadito was involved in an incident with the American merchant ship Allianca off Cape Maisí, Cuba. The Spanish ship attempted to stop Allianca for search on suspicion of filibustering, or smuggling arms to the insurgents in Cuba. This touched off much sensational reporting in the American press and is credited by many with crystallizing anti-Spanish sentiment in the American public in the years preceding the Spanish–American War.

Spanish–American War
In the Spanish–American War Conde del Venadito was first recorded at the port of Santiago de Cuba on 20 April. She first saw real action in the war when defending Havana. She first steamed out of the harbor alongside Nueva España on 14 May at 4:20 PM. She and Nueva España retreated with Aguila and Flecha at dusk. At night, the U.S. vessels occupied the harbor. Whether the shots had any effect is not known, due to the distance from which they were fired.

Fate
She was stricken from the register in 1907. Her hull was later sunk as a target ship in 1936.

Notes

References 
 Chesneau, Roger, and Eugene M. Kolesnik, Eds. Conway's All The World's Fighting Ships 1860–1905. New York: Mayflower Books Inc., 1979. .
 Gray, Randal, Ed. Conway's All The World's Fighting Ships 1906–1921. Annapolis, Maryland: Naval Institute Press, 1985. .

External links 
 Department of the Navy: Naval Historical Center: Online Library of Selected Images: Spanish Navy Ships: Conde del Venadito (Cruiser, 1888–1902)

Velasco-class cruisers
Spanish–American War cruisers of Spain
Ships built in Cartagena, Spain
1888 ships
Maritime incidents in 1895
Maritime incidents in 1936
Ships sunk as targets